Robert Harris (born June 13, 1969 in Riviera Beach, Florida) is a former American football defensive end and defensive tackle in the National Football League. He was drafted by the Minnesota Vikings in the second round of the 1992 NFL Draft. He played college football at Southern University.

After a stint with the Vikings, he would play for the New York Giants.

References

1969 births
Living people
American football defensive tackles
American football defensive ends
Southern Jaguars football players
Minnesota Vikings players
New York Giants players